Criticisms of the labor theory of value affect the historical concept of labor theory of value (LTV) which spans classical economics, liberal economics, Marxian economics, neo-Marxian economics, and anarchist economics. As an economic theory of value, LTV is central to Marxist social-political-economic theory and later gave birth to the concepts of labour exploitation and surplus value. LTV criticisms therefore often appear in the context of economic criticism, not only for the microeconomic theory of Marx but also for Marxism, according to which the working class is exploited under capitalism.

Microeconomic theory 

Adherents of neoclassical economics, the mainstream school of economics, employ the theory of marginalism, which holds that the market value (price) of any good or service is heavily influenced by how many of a given item satisfies any given consumer in the market.
They would argue that in the market, the market value of a good is not simply measured by a single unit's utility to each consumer but by the continuum of how much utility each consumer gets from obtaining 2, 3, 10, 100, etc. of a given product. Consequently, the market price of an object depends not only on the utility each consumer would get for a single unit, but on the lowest marginal utility that can be served by the available supply. 

In microeconomics, this utility maximisation takes place under certain constraints, these are the available numbers of factors of production, for instance, labor (as with Marx profit maximisation takes place under the constraint of available production techniques and the wage rate). In fact, the ultimate restriction is time. Households divide their time (24 hours a day) into leisure time and time for work. Time for work is to make money to buy goods for consumption. The household chooses that amount of leisure time and (via working time) that amount of consumption goods that maximises its utility level. With Marx, working time is not based on a free decision of households, but the outcome of a class struggle between workers and capitalists, the former trying to decrease, the latter to increase working time.

Further, all this does not take account of effects of the accumulation process. With Marx, there is a tendency of equalisation of rate of profit in the accumulation process, which leads to prices of production. If the price of a commodity is above its price of production, then capitalists in that sector earn a super profit (a rate of profit above the average rate of profit of the economy as a whole). As a result, capital is attracted to that sector, production increases, and prices fall until the super profit has been competed away. The resulting prices of production are via  transformation from labor values into prices based on labor times.

According to marginalism, value is subjective (since the same item — leisure time, consumption goods — have a different marginal utility to different consumers, or even to the same consumer under different circumstances) and therefore cannot be determined simply by measuring how much labor is necessary to produce an item. In the Pareto optimum, on the other hand, the exchange relations between commodities are not only determined by their marginal utility, but also by the marginal productivity of the factors of production available.

This means that in marginalism commodities exchange at the marginal amount of labor necessary to produce them. In this sense, an LTV, or, more precisely, a value theory of marginal labor inputs, holds. However, this applies to all factors of production and also to marginal utility. Labor is nothing special. That these several value theories can hold all at the same time is made possible by marginal analysis. The Pareto optimum is defined as a situation where utility is maximised and at the same time all factors of production are employed most efficiently, leading to a situation, where all commodities exchange at their marginal utilities and at their - marginal - amounts of the different factors of production necessary to produce them.

In other words, if empirically it was found out, that commodities exchange according to their marginally necessary labor inputs, this would confirm marginal theory. It would falsify Marx's theory, because according to Marx these exchange ratios are determined by prices of production, which are generally different from the necessary labor inputs, the labor values. Implicitly, Marx is thus denying that capitalism is in a state of Pareto optimality.

Eugen Böhm-Bawerk's criticism 

The Austrian economist Eugen von Böhm-Bawerk argued against both Adam Smith's labor theory of price and Marx's theory of exploitation. On the former, he contended that return on capital arises from the roundabout nature of production, which necessarily involves the passage of time. A steel ladder, for example, is produced and brought to market only if the demand supports the digging of iron ore, the smelting of steel, the machines that press that steel into ladder shape, the machines that make and help maintain those machines and so on.

Roundabout processes, Böhm-Bawerk maintained, lead to a price that pays for more than labor value, and this makes it unnecessary to postulate exploitation to understand the return on capital.

In contrast, Marx argued in Capital that it is not demand that creates, but labor that preserves the value of the commodities obtained prior to the actual process of production - in this case, the iron, steel and machines necessary to make the ladder:
The worker is unable to add new labor, to create new value, without at the same time preserving old values, because the labor he adds must be of a specific useful kind, and he cannot do work of a useful kind without employing products as the means of production of a new product, and thereby transferring their value to the new product. [This] is a gift of nature which costs the worker nothing, but is very advantageous to the capitalist since it preserves the existing value of his capital.

Thus, proponents of the LTV argue, without the necessary addition of human labor-power, the ore, steel and machines would not create any new value on their own, but would in fact gradually depreciate what value they originally possessed through the ravages of time and neglect. Once these materials are activated in the labor process, their values are simply transferred from one commodity to another with no increase. They claim that it is not the materials, but the labor-time present in a commodity that represents its mark-up in value over the course of its production.

Böhm-Bawerk's positive theory of interest also argued that workers trade in their share of the end price for the more certain wages paid by the entrepreneur. Entrepreneurs, he claimed, have given up a safer wage-earning job to take on the role of entrepreneur. In other words, he claimed that profits compensated the entrepreneur for the willingness to bear risk and to wait to receive income.

Böhm-Bawerk's essential argument that employers are compensated for shouldering some risk in paying their employees ahead of time, however, appears unable to explain how profit can be accumulated in cases where workers are reliant on commissions, tips and so on for their income, which are received only after they sell their services. However, Böhm-Bawerk's does provide such an explanation. In the context of a waiter earning tips, the waiter himself is not a wage-earner. The restaurant owner does not make of profit from the tips earned by the waiter. The waiter is essentially an entrepreneur, taking the risk that customers will sufficiently compensate him for the labor he provides, while the customers are under no legal obligation to do so.  The waiter is making an investment of services in anticipation of future return from the customers.  The waiter is compensated by an aggregate amount of earnings from tips that exceeds that labor value provided to the customers, thereby including a return on the waiter's investment. If the tips were not sufficient to provide this return on investment, then the waiter would rationally seek other employment, such as a wage-earning job with similar compensation that does not include the risk element or an entrepreneurial job with similar risk that provides a better return.

Regarding other situations where the employer-entrepreneur does receive a profit from after the labor has been rendered (e.g. a salesperson who works on commission), the employer-entrepreneur may take risks other than paying a wage to the salesman, including: providing a salesperson with an office, cell phone and/or computer; paying for product training and marketing materials; paying for travel and lodging expenses; producing inventory in reliance upon future sales that may or may not be made by the salesperson.  All of this comprises a potential for loss that accounts for the return on investment realised by the employer-entrepreneur.

Nikolai Bukharin argued that Böhm-Bawerk's concept of roundaboutness was untenable in the context of the continuous, simultaneous production of a modern economy.

Methodological individualism 
The Austrian school, led by Eugen von Böhm-Bawerk, argues against the whole tradition of the LTV (see above) and prefers methodological individualism. Neoclassical economics also follows this lead  — and that of Jevons, Menger, and Walras — from the 1870s and discards the LTV in favour of General equilibrium theory, which determines prices based on the interaction of preferences, technology and endowments through supply and demand.

Socially necessary labor 
Marx argues in Capital:

Some people might think that if the value of a commodity is determined by the quantity of labor spent on it, the more idle and un-skillful the laborer, the more valuable would his commodity be, because more time would be required in its production. The labor, however, that forms the substance of value, is homogeneous human labor, expenditure of one uniform labor power. The total labor power of society, which is embodied in the sum total of the values of all commodities produced by that society, counts here as one homogeneous mass of human labor power, composed though it be of innumerable individual units...The labor time socially necessary is that required to produce an article under the normal conditions of production, and with the average degree of skill and intensity prevalent at the time.

Thus, according to Marx any labor power squandered during the production of a commodity, i.e. labor that is socially unnecessary, does not add value as value is determined by the average social labor.

Robert Nozick has criticised the qualifier "socially necessary" in the labor theory of value as not well-defined and concealing a subjective judgement of necessity.  For example, Nozick posits a laborer who spends his time tying knots in a piece of cord.  The laborer does his job as efficiently as is humanly possible, but Marx would likely agree that simply tying knots in cords is not a socially necessary use of labor.  The problem is that what is "socially necessary" depends entirely on whether or not there is demand for the finished product, i.e., the knotted cord.  In this way, introducing the "socially necessary" qualifier into the labor theory of value simply converts the theory into a roundabout and imprecise description of supply and demand. Thus Nozick argues that there is no longer any labor theory of value but rather the notion of what makes labor time socially necessary is dependent upon supply and demand in the market.

Dembinsky argues that the "labour value" metric as proposed by Marx was the main reason for many of the market inefficiencies as observed in Eastern Bloc planned economies. For the "labor value" concept to work, the society needs must be "perfectly known before production commences", the needs must not change in the meantime and the effect of production is required to actually satisfy society's needs, complying with the previously established plan. If any of these conditions is not satisfied, the economy is eventually forced to either allow users to determine their own value in use using market prices (second economy, NEP) or deny the users "the right to assign goods a value in use".

According to Dembinsky, many of the declaratively Marxian economies were effectively left with an open and crucial question on how to actually assess the labor value, which is not clearly answered in Marx works. Most of them applied an ideologically safe "average labor time" model, which had however considerable negative influence on effectiveness by "discouraging marginal productivity gains".

Another criticism is that socially necessary labour time needs to be able to be measured as a homogenous unit of labour, which can then be added up. If socially necessary labour time cannot be measured, then it is difficult to see how Marx's theory can be maintained, as the quantum that Marx viewed as underlying all of capitalism cannot actually be examined. Some critics of Marxism argue that its proponents have failed to find an adequate way to measure socially necessary labour time.

In a socialist society 
It is often assumed that the LTV would apply in a socialist (or post-capitalist) society, though (purportedly at least) without the corresponding exploitation. However, Marx argued in his Critique of the Gotha Programme:

Within the co-operative society based on common ownership of the means of production, the producers do not exchange their products; just as little does the labor employed on the products appear here as the value of these products, as a material quality possessed by them, since now, in contrast to capitalist society, individual labor no longer exists in an indirect fashion but directly as a component part of the social labor.

David Ramsay Steele expands on this:

Numerous Marxist writers, from Marx and Engels down to Charles Bettelheim, have favoured employing units of labor-time for planning production under socialism. This proposal is often referred to as an application of the labor theory of value, though that usage is not in conformity with Marx's. The Marxian labor theory of value (LTV) is intended to explain the determination of prices under commodity production (this is occasionally denied, but see Steele 1986). In Marxian terminology, there can be no 'value' in post-capitalist society. Both the LTV and communist planning conceive of resource allocation being guided by quantities of labor-time. Yet the LTV as an explanation of market prices and the labor-time planning proposal are two distinct theories, which may stand or fall independently. If the LTV were the correct explanation of market prices, this in itself would not show that units of labor-time could be of any practical use in administration of communist industry. And if units of labor-time could effectively be employed for communist planning, this would not require that the LTV be the correct explanation of market prices. [...] According to Marx's theory, actual prices virtually always diverge from 'values' defined as units of labor-time. In Marx's thinking, after 1860, the relationship between 'value' and observed market prices is somewhat analogous to the relationship between 'mass' and 'heaviness', or between 'heat' and everyday awareness of temperature. Marx's 'value' is purportedly necessary to explain price, but it does not correspond to price or equilibrium price (often not even roughly) and therefore obvious disparities between value and price are not seen by Marx as refutations of his theory, though they are seen as contradicting the simple models employed in the early stages of expounding his theory in Volumes I and II of "Capital".

Cases of inapplicability 
The LTV is a theory of capitalist production, or generalised commodity production. However, there are commodities bought and sold under capitalism that have an 'imaginary' price even though they do not have a value.

"Objects that in themselves are no commodities, such as conscience, honour and the like, are capable of being offered for sale by their holders, and of thus acquiring, through their price, the form of commodities. Hence an object may have a price without having value. The price in that case is imaginary, like certain quantities in mathematics. On the other hand, the imaginary price-form may sometimes conceal either a direct or indirect real value-relation; for instance, the price of uncultivated land, which is without value, because no human labor has been incorporated in it" (Capital Volume 1, Chapter 3, section 1).

However the socially necessary labor theory of value only becomes inapplicable for uncultivated land when that land can never be productive no matter how much commercial labor is expended on it.  Desert sand, gibber plains and icy wastes have very small land values because no commercial labor can be diverted from other uses to be usefully employed. In other cases, the price-form represents the indirect socially necessary labor that could be usefully employed:
 Pieces of art could be explained as instances of monopoly.
 Uncultivated land has a price, even if there is no labor involved. The price of land is explained by the theory of rent. Both Ricardo and Marx developed theories of land-rent based on the LTV.
 Paper money—according to Marx, "[t]he function of gold as coin becomes completely independent of the metallic value of that gold. Therefore things that are relatively without value, such as paper notes, can serve as coins in its place" (Capital, Vol 1, Part 1) Section 2.
 Value of shares is explained similarly like the value of land.

Importance of labor 
Marx stated that only labor could cause an increase in exchange value. Assuming that all labor is equal, this suggests that labor-intensive industries ought to realize a higher profit than those that use less labor. This contradicts the tendency, accepted by Marx, that rates of profit between industries should become equal. Marx explained this contradiction by the fact that in real economic life prices vary not randomly, but in a systematic way from values. The mathematics applied to the transformation problem—transformation of labor values into production prices—attempt to describe this (albeit with the unwelcome side consequences described above).

Critics (following, for instance, studies of Piero Sraffa) respond that this makes the once intuitively appealing theory very complicated; and that there is no justification for asserting that only labor and not for example grain can increase value. Any commodity can be picked instead of labor for being the commodity with the unique power of creating value, and with equal justification one could set out a corn theory of value, identical to the labor theory of value. Anarchist Robert Paul Wolff, despite identifying as a Marxist on economic matters, nevertheless offers such a critique, saying "By reproducing for corn [grain] or iron or coal, all the striking results that Marx derived concerning for labor, we have, it seems to me, raised questions about the foundations of Marx's critique of capitalism and classical political economy."

However, there may be several problems with this criticism. The starting point for Marx's argument was as such: "What is the common social substance of all commodities? It is labor." It is not possible to view grain, iron etc. as common to all commodities, whereas the production of commodities is impossible without labor (while it can also be said that other commodities such as tools are required, they cannot be properly aggregated by value because they are specialised and disparate in nature and their values, relative to each other and to labor, depend on prices that in turn depend on their values; Sraffa (1960), for instance, aggregates them according to the labor required for their production). Marx identifies the substance of value as labor, which in his view is not a commodity (though "labor power" is). This was a necessary aspect for the substance of value Marx elaborates upon in Capital and Theories of Surplus Value.

Some supporters of the LTV, however, accept the thrust of the "corn theory of value" critique, but emphasise the social aspect of what Marx calls the "common social substance", arguing that labor power is unique as it is the only commodity not sold by capitalists but rather sold by the workers themselves, whose income tends to a minimum, because they have nothing else to sell. The surplus product is appropriated by the capitalists. Alan Freeman argues: "This is of course true of other commodities [than labor power] also; but other commodities do not walk around the market disposing of their income on an equal basis with their owners. The cost of labor power is determined independently of its capacity to make money for its purchaser. This, and no other reason, is why profit exists. If laborers were hired directly as slaves, robots, beasts of burden or servants, then whether or not labor time were the measure of value, surplus labor would not be extracted in the form of money profits but directly, like domestic labor." Albert Einstein, in his description of the LTV, argues similarly: "It is important to understand that even in theory the payment of the worker is not determined by the value of his product."
Marx writes on this: “In the slave system, the money-capital invested in the purchase of labor-power plays the role of the money-form of the fixed capital, which is but gradually replaced as the active period of the slave’s life expires.”

David Steele argues that Marx gives no good reason why labor should have a "privileged position in the determination of prices", when any other input could be used - machines, paper or even capital itself. Steele notes that commodities almost never have equal quantities of labor and that Marx's argument rests upon the assumption that when commodities are exchanged, they must have "something" in common and that something can be nothing but labor. Steele argues as such: [...] any input could be chosen as a creator of value [...] Thus a 'paper theory of value' would hold that prices were ultimately determined by values, defined as quantities of 'socially necessary paper' (measured in pounds weight). The organic composition of capital would be the ratio of non-paper means of production to paper, and it would be asserted that only paper created new value, and therefore surplus-value. The whole of Capital could be rewritten, substituting 'paper' for 'labor'. Exploitation of paper-owners would occur because they do not really sell their paper, but rather their 'paper-power'. Goods requiring no paper inputs would be regarded as having 'imaginary prices', just as Marx regarded salable goods which require no labor inputs. The same thing, of course, could be done with 'electricity', 'liquid', 'metal', or 'machines', or it could be done with 'capital' (constant capital, which would then have to be renamed variable capital), thus showing that the capitalist class produces all wealth and is exploited by other classes, especially the wholly unproductive working class, which contributes no capital and therefore no value. To provide support for Marx's theory, it is necessary to show both that prices can be mathematically derived from labor-values (the transformation problem) and to present a good argument why we would wish to do this - why the class of inputs known as 'labor' should be given this privileged position in the determination of prices.

Steele thus refers to marginal theory, under which labor is just another input in the production process and therefore concludes that to say that capital exploits labor makes as much sense as saying "that labor exploits capital, or electricity exploits roofing tiles". Indeed, it has been argued that Marx never offered (despite promising to do so in Volume 3 of Capital) a positive proof for his theory or an explanation for why labour-power is the only commodity that can create more value. Steele also argues that Marx thought that prices needed to be explained by some third factor, beyond supply and demand, because he believed that when supply and demand balance or equal each other, they can cancel each other out and thus could not explain equilibrium prices (hence the need for the labour theory of value to explain equilibrium prices). Steele argues this is mistaken as it is based on the view that supply and demand are magnitudes or numbers, when really they can be viewed more like schedules or functions. Supply and demand, when equal, do not cancel each other out but rather they are actually coinciding; at that particular price, the quantity supplied is equal to the quantity demanded. Price is thus always (proximately) determined by supply and demand, even when the two coincide. Thus when supply and demand are understood this way, Marx's argument cannot be forwarded. Eugene Böhm-Bawerk uses an analogy to a balloon filled with gas. The balloon will continue to rise through the air until the air pressure of the atmosphere and the air pressure within the balloon are in equilibrium. Thus the height of the balloon can only be explained by considering the relative density of the balloon on one side and the atmosphere on the other. However, Böhm-Bawerk argues that if Marx's view of equilibrium is used, then one would have to say that the densities would cancel each other out and thus have "ceased to act", meaning they cannot explain why the balloon is now floating, which is incorrect as it is the relative densities that explain why the balloon floats. Thus for Böhm-Bawerk, it is simply inaccurate to state that supply and demand cannot explain equilibrium prices because they supposedly cancel each other out.

Meghnad Desai, Baron Desai observed that there is also the prospect of surplus value arising from sources other than labour and a classic given example is winemaking. When grapes are harvested and crushed, labour is used. However, when yeast is added and the grape juice is left to ferment in order to get wine, the value of wine exceeds that of the grapes significantly, yet labour contributes nothing to the extra value. Marx had ignored capital inputs due to placing them all together in constant capital—translating the wear and tear of capital in production in terms of its labour value. Yet examples such as this demonstrated that value and surplus value could come from somewhere other than labour. Some Marxists argue that this criticism is erroneous because the labour theory of value was only ever meant to refer to freely reproducible commodities (i.e. those not limited by scarcity), which would exempt goods such as wine, paintings, land and so forth. However, a counter-criticism is that this position makes no sense because non-freely reproducible commodities are still commodities and if Marx wishes to find a common factor that underlies all commodities, this common factor must exist in all commodities, rather than a narrow conception of commodities. Marx has also been criticised for not making clear in his writings when he is using "commodity" in this narrow conception.

Since Marx argued that skilled labor was simply "condensed" labor, he has been accused of circular reasoning, as he resolves the issue of the value of skilled labor in the labor theory of value by assuming the labor theory of value is true so that skilled labor is judged by its exchange-value. It has been argued that Marx's effort to distinguish between skilled and unskilled labor was incoherent, as all labor ultimately required some degree of skill - true unskilled labor would only be possible with mindless automatons as workers still need to think in order to produce. This means it is not possible to reduce skilled labor to unskilled labor (and thus determine the number of unskilled labor hours) because all labor is skilled, meaning that value cannot be determined just by counting labor hours. Furthermore, Marx asserted that skilled labor is allegedly more productive than unskilled labor, yet this explanation is both circular and incomplete. It is circular because productivity can only be compared by using wage and price differences, the very thing the labor theory of value is supposed to explain. It is incomplete because Marx does not explain why the additional value-creating power of skilled labor should necessarily be related to the labor cost of skill acquisition. While one suggested solution is that the skilled labor transfers its production time to the commodity it produces, this solution means that it is not the total number of hours of skill creation that matter but only those that the worker or their employer end up paying for, when in reality economics and politics are never separate, thus rendering the equilibrium assumptions behind the theory untenable. Much training is provided by the government, community and house for free. In addition, the economy is almost never at a fully competitive equilibrium, so there is no guarantee that the education and training will be transacted for at their value. Lastly, it is unclear what should be used as measure of unskilled labor (the unskilled labor of a school graduate, a peasant, a hunter-gatherer etc.) by which to measure skilled labor.

Post-Keynesian criticism 
The post-Keynesian economist Joan Robinson, who was otherwise sympathetic to Marx's writings, was strongly critical of the labor theory of value. She wrote that it was essentially a "metaphysical doctrine" and "logically a mere rigmarole of words". She writes: Value is something different from price, which accounts for prices, and which in turn has to be accounted for. And to account for it by labour-time is mere assertion... This theory of prices is not a myth... Nor was it intended to be an original contribution to science. It was simply an orthodox dogma.

Others have pointed out that the labor theory of value is based on a failure to recognize the properly dialectical component of human desire. Philip Pilkington writes: [V]alue is attributed to objects due to our desire for them. This desire, in turn, is inter-subjective. We desire to gain [a] medal or to capture [an] enemy flag [in battle] because it will win recognition in the eyes of our peers. [A] medal [or an enemy] flag are not valued for their objective properties, nor are they valued for the amount of labour embodied in them, rather they are desired for the symbolic positions they occupy in the inter-subjective network of desires.

Pilkington says that this is a different theory of value than the one we find in many economics textbooks. He writes that in mainstream marginalist theory consumers are viewed in an atomistic manner, unaffected by the desires of their peers. He writes that "actors in marginalist analysis have self-contained preferences; they do not have inter-subjective desires". He says that dialectical analyses of value can be found in the work of Thorstein Veblen and James Duesenberry.

Ecological economics 
In ecological economics, it is argued that labor is in fact energy over time. However, echoing Joan Robinson, Alf Hornborg argues that both the reliance on "energy theory of value" and "labor theory of value" are problematic as they propose that use-values (or material wealth) are more "real" than exchange-values (or cultural wealth)—yet, use-values are culturally determined. For Hornborg, any Marxist argument that claims uneven wealth is due to the "exploitation" or "underpayment" of use-values is actually a tautological contradiction, since it must necessarily quantify "underpayment" in terms of exchange-value. The alternative would be to conceptualize unequal exchange as "an asymmetric net transfer of material inputs in production (e.g., embodied labor, energy, land, and water), rather than in terms of an underpayment of material inputs or an asymmetric transfer of 'value'". In other words, uneven exchange is characterised by incommensurability, namely: the unequal transfer of material inputs; competing value-judgements of the worth of labor, fuel, and raw materials; differing availability of industrial technologies; and the off-loading of environmental burdens on those with less resources.

References

Bibliography 
 

labor theory of value
Labour economics
Criticisms of economics
Marxian economics
Classical economics
Theory of value (economics)